Shudder is an American over-the-top subscription video on demand service featuring horror, thriller and supernatural fiction titles, owned and operated by AMC Networks.

Original programming

Drama

Unscripted

Docuseries

Variety

Co-productions

Continuations

Original films

Feature films

Documentaries

References

External links

Shudder